Petrovici is a surname. Notable people with the surname include:

 Anton Petrovici (1790s–1854), Wallachian composer, musicologist, and poet
 Cristina Petrovici (born 1950), Romanian handball player 
 Emil Petrovici (1899–1968), Romanian linguist
 Ion Petrovici (1882–1972), Romanian philosopher
 Ion N. Petrovici (born 1929), Romanian-born German neurologist

See also
 Petrovići (disambiguation)
 Petrovichi (disambiguation)

Romanian-language surnames